Snake River Canyon may refer to the following geographical areas on the Snake River in the western United States:

Snake River Canyon (Idaho), near Twin Falls
Snake River Canyon (Wyoming), near Jackson
Hells Canyon, also known as Snake River Canyon, in North Central Idaho